Huangnitang may refer to:

 Huangnitang, Loudi (黄泥塘街道),  a subdistrict of Louxing District, Loudi City, Hunan.
 Huangnitang Village, Changshan (黄泥塘村), a village of Tianma Subdistrict, Changshan County, Zhejiang.